Hamid Arzulu (Hamid Aliyev; b. 15 May 1937) is an Azerbaijani poet, writer, translator, dramatist, scientist, teacher and a doctor of philology. He lives in the city of Nakhchivan, Azerbaijan.

Hamid Arzulu is one of the Nakhchivan Autonomous Republic's intellectuals. He came to literature with poems, then as well as publication and literary translation from German language effective activity made him famous among readers.
In the book of "Call me" and "Hanbadzhy and its guests" all the poems tell that how the author dup knows the national nature of people. His satirical poems in arus metre in free metre "You tell me spean openly", "The legends of our village", "My holiday Novrus is coming", won the first prize from the newspaper competition "The east end" poem "Geydarname".

He was connected in the field of translation from German language and workedstrained. He translated and published into our language the works by German classic writer Heinrich Heine ("Die Harzreise"), Goethe's lyric poetry "West-Eastern Divan", Gotthold Ephraim Lessing's dramas "Nathan the Wise", "Emilia Galotti"  and    "Minna von Barnhelm", Friedrich Schiller's  "Ballads", Bertolt Brecht's drama "Chalk cross" and Stefan Zweig's Novels.

Hamid Arzulu is the first scientist who defended "Poetic Forms and the principles of the features characteristic of species in literary translation from German into Azerbaijani language". In 1988 he defended a thesis and obtemedthe philological candidate of sciences.  
in 2010 he defended a doctorate degree "Theoretical and practical principles of German classiec poetry into Azerbaijani language"s:Technical and practical principles of German classic poetry into Azerbaijani language. He published "600 German-Azerbaijan dictionary of proverbs".

Publications
"Theoretical and practical principles of the translation of German classic poetry into Azerbaijani language"s:Technical and practical principles of German classic poetry into Azerbaijani language. Baku : Elm, 2003.
"Poetic Forms and the principles of the features characteristic of species in literary translation from German into Azerbaijani language".
"600 German-Azerbaijan dictionary of proverbs". Baku 2004. 
"Nathan the Wise" (translation of Gotthold Ephraim Lessing's poem cycle). Baku 2004.
"Emilia Galotti" (translation of Gotthold Ephraim Lessing's poem cycle). Baku.
"Minna von Barnhelm" (translation of Gotthold Ephraim Lessing's poem cycle). Baku.
"Chalk cross" (translation of Bertolt Brecht's drama cycle). Baku.
"West-Östlicher diwan" (translation of Goethe's poem cycle).  Baku. 
"Die Harzreise" (translation of Heinrich Heine poem cycle).  	Baku :Writer 2000 
"The legends of our village". (fiction) Baku :Writer 1998.
"Faith". pyes (fiction) Baku :1979.
"Robber Qushdan" roman (fiction) Baky : Writer Adebi Neshrler evi, 2000.
"I open my heart" (fiction) Baku :Writer 1986.

References

"Historicity in creative work Hamid Arzulu", by H.Eyvazlı. "School" publishing house.  2003
 "Azerbaijan teacher newspaper". Poet, teacher and scientist.

1937 births
Living people
People from the Nakhchivan Autonomous Republic
Azerbaijani poets
Azerbaijani dramatists and playwrights
Azerbaijani writers
Azerbaijani philologists
Azerbaijani translators
Translators to Azerbaijani
Azerbaijani educators
20th-century Azerbaijani dramatists and playwrights
21st-century Azerbaijani dramatists and playwrights
20th-century Azerbaijani educators
21st-century Azerbaijani educators